The shiny guinea pig (Cavia fulgida) is a guinea pig species of southeastern South America.

The rodent is endemic to Brazil. It is native to the Atlantic Forest ecoregions.

Taxonomy
Wagler first called the species Cavia fulgida in 1831; P. W. Lund identified a Cavia rufescens in 1841, but since Oldfield Thomas (1901) these are considered to be identical species.

See also

References

Guinea pigs
Fauna of the Atlantic Forest
Mammals of Brazil
Rodents of South America
Mammals described in 1831
Taxa named by Johann Georg Wagler